Owen H.M. Smith is an American television producer, writer, actor and comedian.

Smith has written for such television series as Black-ish, Survivor's Remorse, The Arsenio Hall Show, The Nightly Show with Larry Wilmore and Whitney and acted on such series as Everybody Hates Chris. As a comedian he has performed Stand-up on Conan and The Late Show with Stephen Colbert.

Smith also co-hosted the podcast called "Alias Smith and LeRoi" with comedian Ali LeRoi.

References

External links

1973 births
Living people
African-American male actors
African-American television directors
American film producers
American male screenwriters
American male television actors
American television directors
American television producers
American television writers
American male television writers
American podcasters
American stand-up comedians
21st-century American comedians
21st-century American screenwriters
21st-century American male writers
21st-century African-American writers
20th-century African-American people
African-American male writers